Seventeen is a 1951 American musical that debuted in the United States starring Kenneth Nelson.

Overview
Set in Indianapolis in 1907, Seventeen is based on Booth Tarkington’s Seventeen: A Tale of Youth and Summer Time and the Baxter Family Especially William, a series of sketches first published in 1914 in Metropolitan Magazine, before being collected into a book two years later. Adapted as a stage play, then as a silent film, it became a 1926 musical under the title Hello, Lola.

In an adaptation by The New Yorker writer Sally Benson, and music by Walter Kent and lyrics by Kim Gannon, Seventeen opened at the Broadhurst Theatre on Broadway June 21, 1951.  The show detailed the puppy-love romance between 17-year-old Willie Baxter and the flirtatious Lola Pratt, portrayed by Kenneth Nelson and Ann Crowley.  It ran for 182 performances.

References

External links

Seventeen at iTunes

1951 musicals
Broadway musicals
Musicals based on novels
Musicals based on films